Mytilopsis is a genus of small fresh- and brackishwater mussels in the family Dreissenidae.

Species
Species within the genus Mytilopsis are:
 Mytilopsis adamsi J. P. E. Morrison, 1946
 Mytilopsis africana (Van Beneden, 1835)
 Mytilopsis lacustris (Morelet, 1860)
 Mytilopsis leucophaeata (Conrad, 1831)
 Mytilopsis ornata (Morelet, 1885)
 Mytilopsis sallei (Récluz, 1849)
 Mytilopsis trautwineana (Tryon, 1866)

Synonyms:
 Mytilopsis allyneana accepted as Mytilopsis adamsi
 Mytilopsis domingensis accepted as Mytilopsis sallei
 Mytilopsis zeteki accepted as  Mytilopsis adamsi
 Mytilopsis lopesi accepted as  Rheodreissena lopesi

References

Dreissenidae
Bivalve genera
Taxa named by Timothy Abbott Conrad